The Central District of Mehdishahr County is a district (bakhsh) in Mehdishahr County, Semnan Province, Iran. It was formed after the 2006 census.  The District has two cities: Mehdishahr and Darjazin. The District has one rural district (dehestan): Darjazin Rural District.

References 

Districts of Semnan Province
Mehdishahr County